Music of India

Indian music may refer to:
Native American music
Music of Central America, and in particular, of its indigenous peoples
Music of South America, and in particular, of its indigenous peoples; see List of South American folk music traditions
Caribbean music, or West Indian music
Indo-Caribbean music